After the Incident (Persian: بعد از اتفاق, romanized: Bad az Etefagh) is a 2020 Iranian drama film written and directed by Pouria Heidary Oureh. The film screened for the first time at the International Film Festival for Children and Youth.

Plot 
A child named Ruhollah who decided to cope with the situation after an unfortunate incident and try to achieve his goals...

Reception

Awards and nominations

References

External links 
 
2020 directorial debut films
2020 films
Iranian drama films
2020s Persian-language films
2020 drama films